The Villa Ispahan at 57 Boulevard du Jardin Exotique is a Persian style Belle Époque building in Moneghetti, Monaco. It was built in 1910 by the Persian diplomat Prince Arfa Mirza Riza Khan. The villa is modelled on the Shah Mosque in Isfahan in Iran, with blue minarets. It is decorated with mosaics, coloured glass and motifs including the Persian Lion and Sun emblem.  A museum of Persian Art and Culture in the 1960's, the Villa Ispahan was listed for sale in 2019 with 9 rooms spread over 548 m2.

The building was home to a museum of Iranian art, sculptures, and objets d'art curated by Baroness Marie Roze Trenk, grand-daughter of opera singer Marie Roze.  Prince Arfa's collection was sold by Sotheby's at Monte Carlo's Sporting d'Hiver club in 1983.

The Villa Ispahan is the site of the Consulate of Indonesia in Monaco.

References

Houses completed in 1910
Ispahan
Qajar architecture
Belle Époque